Gina Bramhill is a British actress.

Background 
Gina Bramhill was born in Eastoft, where she grew up on a farm. As a child, she appeared in several school plays. She was trained at the Royal Academy of Dramatic Art. Shortly after graduating she appeared as Bella in the movie Lotus Eaters. 2012 she got a role as the recurring character Eve Sands in the TV series Being Human. In the same year Bramhill played one of the main roles in the drama pilot The Frontier. In Coronation Street she portrayed the character Jodie Woodward. She got a main role in the movie Pleasure Island, which was shown at the Cannes Film Festival in 2014.

Bramhill also appears on theatre. In 2011 she played the rebellious teenager Annabel in Chicken at the Southwark Playhouse. She was Melody in Bad Jews at the Ustinov Studio in Bath.

Filmography

External links

References 

Living people
English film actresses
English television actresses
21st-century English actresses
1989 births
Alumni of RADA